James L. Emery (July 22, 1931– October 26, 2021) was an American politician from New York.

Life
He was born on July 22, 1931, in Lakeville, Livingston County, New York. He attended Livonia Central School. He graduated from the University of Cincinnati's College of Business Administration.

He entered politics as a Republican, and was Sheriff of Livingston County.

He was a member of the New York State Assembly from 1965 to 1982, sitting in the 175th, 176th, 177th, 178th, 179th,  180th, 181st, 182nd, 183rd and 184th New York State Legislatures. He was Minority Leader from 1979 to 1982.

In 1982, Emery was a contender for the Republican nomination for Governor of New York, but eventually was nominated for Lieutenant Governor of New York on the Republican and Conservative tickets, with Lewis Lehrman for Governor. They were defeated by the Democratic and Liberal nominees Mario Cuomo and Alfred DelBello.

In October 1983, Emery was nominated by President Ronald Reagan as Administrator of the St. Lawrence Seaway Development Corporation. He was confirmed by the U.S. Senate in February 1984 for a term of seven years. He remained on the post until 1991 when he was succeeded by Stanford Parris.

He married Elsie McPhail, with whom he had two sons in 1957.

His second wife Jill Houghton Emery (born 1941) ran in 1984 for Congress in the 34th District, but was defeated by the incumbent Democrat Stan Lundine.  He was later married to Sandra Johnson Emery (born 1946).

Emery died in October 26, 2021 in Summerville, South Carolina.

References

1931 births
2021 deaths
People from Livonia, New York
Republican Party members of the New York State Assembly
University of Cincinnati alumni
New York (state) sheriffs